Dobble was a Ghanaian hiplife and highlife duo based in Accra, Ghana. The group is composed of Paa Kwasi (Nana Kwasi Aryeh), and EnnWai (Gideon Edu Gyamfi). They won most popular song of the year with their hit song titled "Christy" at the 2017 Vodafone Ghana Music Awards.

Career
Dobble released countless hits and performed on several big stages. Some of their hits songs include Walai Talai, Otan Hunu, Eee Mana, Gud Mood, Spark Ma Moto, 'Deepest Side' featured Shatta Wale, 'Wat Can Come Can Come' also featured Bisa Kdei, and among others.

Their release "Walai Talai", became an instant hit under Phibi Records and they became one of the biggest music duos in Ghana.

However, it became obvious that they no longer attended events as a unit after one member, Nana Yaw, boycotted all events and told friends privately that he was readying himself for a solo project, this led the group to break up but continue to win the Most Popular Song of the Year with their hit song 'Christy' at Vodafone Ghana Music Awards in 2017.

Discography

Singles 
 "Walai Talai" (2010)
 "Ee Mana" (2012)
 "Wop3 Eyi" (2012)
 "Ole Seke" (2013)
 "Gud Mood" (2014)
 "Tres Bien" (2015)
 "Christy" (2016)

Awards and nominations

Videography

References

External links
 

Ghanaian musical groups